Year 661 (DCLXI) was a common year starting on Friday (link will display the full calendar) of the Julian calendar. The denomination 661 for this year has been used since the early medieval period, when the Anno Domini calendar era became the prevalent method in Europe for naming years.

Events 
 By place 

 Europe 
 King Chlothar III of Neustria and queen regent Balthild found Corbie Abbey in Picardy (northern France), giving it immunity from taxation, and visits from local bishops in exchange for prayer.
 Perctarit and Godepert become co-rulers of the Lombards, following the death of their father Aripert I. They split the kingdom, and establish their capitals in Milan and Pavia (northern Italy).

 Britain 
 Battle of Posbury: King Cenwalh of Wessex invades Dumnonia (south-west England). He is victorious over the native Briton tribes near Crediton in Devon, and drives them to the coast.
 King Wulfhere of Mercia and his army harry the Berkshire Downs (south of Thame) and move south to conquer the Meonwara and the Isle of Wight.
 Wulfhere appoints Æthelwealh as king of Sussex, and Æthelwealh is baptized in Mercia. He receives the recently-conquered territories in modern-day Hampshire.

 Arabian Empire (Islamic Caliphate) 

 January 26 – Assassination of Ali: Ali ibn Abi Talib, first Shia imam and fourth caliph of the Rashidun Caliphate, is struck on the head with a poisoned sword by the Khawarij Abd-al-Rahman ibn Muljam, while at prayer at a shrine at Kufa (modern-day Iraq), dying two days later. His son, Hasan ibn Ali, is chosen by Muslims to succeed him as the next leader. According to the Umayyads, he is succeeded by Muawiyah I as Caliph, age 59, who moves his seat of government to Damascus, and founds the Umayyad Caliphate, ending the Rashidun Caliphate.
 Approximate date – Muawiya I imprisons patriarch Giwargis I, after his refusal to pay tribute. Christians are persecuted and their churches are destroyed.

 Japan 
 Approximate date – The imperial fleet of Japan invades Kyūshū by the order of Empress Kōgyoku. On its way, princess Nukata composes a famous poem at Nikitatsu in Iyo Province.
 c. May – Empress Kōgyoku builds the palace of Asakura in Kyūshū, from trees cut down from the shrines. Two months later she dies. People say it is because the gods are angry with her for destroying the shrines.
 July 24 – Emperor Tenji ascends to the throne of Japan after his mother Empress Kōgyoku's death. He sends an expeditionary force under Abe no Hirafu to Korea, to help the allied kingdom of Baekje.

 Korea 
 King Munmu becomes the 30th ruler of the Korean kingdom of Silla.

 By topic 
 Religion 
 Maximus the Confessor, Christian monk, is recalled from exile in Thrace. He is tried, and sentenced to mutilation. His tongue and his right hand are cut off to prevent his further opposition to the Monothelites. 
 Approximate date – In Gaul all Roman bishops are replaced with Frankish bishops. They become increasingly common, as Frankish leaders control the episcopate.

Births 
 February 12 – Ōku, Japanese princess (d. 702)
 Early June? – Al-Hajjaj ibn Yusuf, Arab governor (d. 714)
 Approximate date – Ælfwine, Northumbrian king of Deira (k. 679)
 Chen Zi'ang, Chinese poet and official (d. 702)
 Liu Zhiji, Chinese historian (d. 721)

Deaths 
 January 3 – Benjamin, Coptic Orthodox Patriarch of Alexandria (b. c.590)
 January 29 – Ali, first Shia Imam and Fourth Rashidun Caliph (b. 601) (martyred)
 February 17 – Finan of Lindisfarne, Irish-born bishop
 July 24 – Kōgyoku (also Saimei), twice empress of Japan (b. 594)
 Aripert I, king of the Lombards
 Cenberht, West Saxon king in Wessex
 Cuthred, West Saxon prince in Wessex
 Approximate date – Landry, bishop of Paris
 Al-Ash'ath ibn Qays, companion of the Muhammad

References

Sources